Holy Innocents Church, South Norwood is a Church of England parish church in the south London suburb of South Norwood, dedicated to the Holy Innocents. It was built in Neo-Gothic imitation of Perpendicular architecture between 1894 and 1895 to designs by the British architect George Frederick Bodley. Though a planned tower was never built, the church itself has been Grade II* listed since 1976.

References

South Norwood
Grade II* listed churches in London
1895 establishments in England
George Frederick Bodley church buildings